Mário Claúdio Nogueira Carreiras (born 30 March 1985), known as Marinho, is a Portuguese futsal player who plays as a winger for Braga/AAUM and the Portugal national team.

In July 2013, Marinho left Benfica and joined Italian side Luparense.

Honours
Benfica
 UEFA Futsal Cup: 2009–10
 Liga Portuguesa: 2011–12
 Taça de Portugal: 2011–12
 Supertaça de Portugal: 2009, 2011, 20112

References

External links
UEFA profile

1985 births
Living people
Sportspeople from Porto
Portuguese men's futsal players
S.L. Benfica futsal players